Cölestin Josef Ganglbauer, O.S.B (20 August 1817 in Thanstetten – 14 December 1889 in Vienna) was a Cardinal of the Roman Catholic Church and Archbishop of Vienna.

Early life and education
Josef Ganglbauer was born in Schiedlberg, Austria. He entered the Order of Saint Benedict, taking the name Cölestin. He had his religious profession on 25 August 1842. Studied theology in Linz from 1839 until 1843, receiving minor orders on 26 August 1842 and the diaconate on 15 July 1843.

Priesthood
He was ordained priest on 22 July 1843, working in the parish of Neuhofen until 1846. Then he started academic career. He was elected Prior of the monastery of Kremsmünster in 1875 and was elected its abbot on 19 April 1876.

Episcopate and cardinalate
Ganglbauer was appointed Archbishop of Vienna on 4 August 1881. Pope Leo XIII created him cardinal priest in the consistory of 10 November 1884 with the title of Sant'Eusebio.

Death
He died on 14 December 1889 at 1:25 p.m. in the archiepiscopal palace in Vienna. The remains were laid to rest in the metropolitan cathedral.

External links

 The Cardinals of the Holy Roman Church - Biographical Dictionary
 Catholic Hierarchy data for this cardinal

1817 births
1889 deaths
19th-century Austrian cardinals
Archbishops of Vienna
People from Steyr-Land District
Austrian Benedictines
Cardinals created by Pope Leo XIII
Benedictine cardinals